This is a list of companies on the Hong Kong Stock Exchange (HKEx), ordered numerically  by stock code.  The names of the companies appear exactly as they do on the stock exchange listing.  This is not an exhaustive list, but reflects the list that appears on HKEx's Hyperlink Directory. An exhaustive but un-linked list appears below the partial list.

0001 - 0099

0100 - 0198

0200 - 0299

0300 - 0395

0402 - 0498

0500 - 0599

0601 - 0699

0700 - 0778

0800 - 0897

0900 - 0999

1001 - 1099

1100 - 1199

1200–1999

2000–2299

2300 - 2398

2600–2799

ETF funds

2866–2899

3000–3999

4000–4999

NASDAQ Shares

6000 - 6200

Hong Kong Depositary Receipts

6800 - 6899

8000 – 8999

9000 – 9999

References

 
Stock Exchange
Hong Kong
Stock exchanges in Hong Kong